Stray Dolls is a 2019 American crime film directed by Sonejuhi Sinha and written by Sonejuhi Sinha and Charlotte Rabate. The film stars Geetanjali Thapa, Olivia DeJonge, Cynthia Nixon, Robert Aramayo and Samrat Chakrabarti.

Cast
Geetanjali Thapa as Riz
Olivia DeJonge as Dallas
Cynthia Nixon as Una
Robert Aramayo as Jimmy
Samrat Chakrabarti as Sal 
Rosemary Howard as Doreen
John Schiappa as Floyd
Kelvin McGrue as Mikey
Yvette Lashawn Williams as Peaches
Puy Navarro as Sandy

Release
The film premiered at the Tribeca Film Festival on April 27, 2019. On September 23, 2019, Samuel Goldwyn Films acquired distribution rights to the film. It was scheduled to be released on April 10, 2020.

Reception
The site's critical consensus reads, "Stray Dolls doesn't make it easy to identify with its central characters, but director/co-writer Sonejuhi Sinha's depiction of the American underbelly is compelling." On Metacritic, the film has a weighted average score of 58 out of 100 based on 8 reviews, indicating "generally favorable reviews".

Jessica Kiang of Variety magazine called Stray Dolls "stylish" and "seemingly seductive". Justin Lowe of The Hollywood Reporter called the film "alternately incisive and uneven", while Jeannette Catsoulis of The New York Times said that "despite its sense of dead-end desperation, [the film] is made worthwhile by the richness of Shane Sigler's nighttime cinematography and the consistent empathy of its tone".

References

External links

2019 crime films
American crime films
2010s English-language films
2010s American films